Dokuz Eylul University Symphony Orchestra was founded in 2001 by Dokuz Eylül University in İzmir.

External links
Dokuz Eylul University Website 
Dokuz Eylul University Forum
Dokuz Eylul University Dictionary 

Musical groups established in 2001
Turkish symphony orchestras
2001 establishments in Turkey
University orchestras